Amudhan R. P. ( (Puṣhpam Rāmaliŋkam Amudhaņ), born 1971 in Madurai) is a documentary film maker and media activist. Along with local youth, he founded Marupakkam, a media activism group that is involved with making documentaries, organising regular screenings, film festivals and media workshops in and around Madurai. He has been making documentaries since 1997. His prominent films include two trilogies on caste and nuclear radiation. 'Shit' has won the best film award at the One Billion Eyes film festival in 2005 and the National Jury Award at the MIFF 2006.

Amudhan R.P. founded Madurai International Documentary and Short Film Festival in 1998 and has been organising the festival since then.

Filmography

Awards and honors

Amudhan R. P. has received awards like:
Best film award, One Billion Eyes film festival in 2005.
The National Jury Award, 9th Mumbai International Film Festival in 2006.

References

External links
Amudhan R P's blog
Amudhan R P's filmography
Amudhan R P's page in ucfilms.in
The Hindu news-site article(2010) on Amudhan R P

Lucy Merchant's article on Amudhan R P
Wiki page about his film(Foot Wear) screening

Videos
Stories Part 01: Manavalakurichi (full film)
Trailer of the documentary,Shit
Trailer of the documentary,Notes from the Crematorium
Trailer of the documentary, Radiation Stories Part 01 Manavalakurichi
Trailer of the documentary, Radiation Stories Part 03 Koodankulam

Indian documentary filmmakers
Tamil-language film directors
Living people
1971 births
Artists from Madurai
Film directors from Tamil Nadu
21st-century Indian film directors